Michael Todd McEwen (born August 10, 1956) is a Canadian former professional ice hockey player. He was a three-time Stanley Cup winner who played with seven different NHL teams. He also played in the 1980 NHL All-Star Game.

Biography
McEwen was born in Hornepayne, Ontario. As a youth, he played in the 1968 and 1969 Quebec International Pee-Wee Hockey Tournament with minor ice hockey teams from Toronto.

An offensive-minded defenseman, McEwen was selected by the New York Rangers in the 1976 NHL Draft. His talents immediately paid dividends as he helped guide the Rangers to the finals in 1979.  His tenure with the Rangers would not last long as he was traded to the Colorado Rockies in the giant trade that sent Barry Beck to New York.

His stay with the Rockies was short-lived as he would frequently clash with head coach Don Cherry, and he was eventually traded to the New York Islanders in the deal that sent Steve Tambellini and Chico Resch to the Rockies.  The trade would soon pay off for the Islanders as his offensive talents helped them in three of their Stanley Cup championships, in 1981, 1982 and 1983.

McEwen would also play for the Los Angeles Kings, Washington Capitals, Detroit Red Wings and Hartford Whalers before his NHL career ended following the 1987–88 season.

McEwen was the first coach of the Oklahoma City Blazers, whom he coached to three consecutive playoff appearances in 1992-93, 1993–94, and 1994–95.

McEwen currently resides in Oklahoma City, Oklahoma. He is involved in daily operations of Kids First, a program designed to open hockey up to youth of all ages.

Legacy

In the 2009 book 100 Ranger Greats, the authors ranked McEwen at No. 98 all-time of the 901 New York Rangers who had played during the team's first 82 seasons.

Career statistics

Coaching statistics

References

External links

Profile at hockeydraftcentral.com

1956 births
Binghamton Whalers players
Canadian ice hockey defencemen
Canadian people of Scottish descent
Colorado Rockies (NHL) players
Detroit Red Wings players
EHC Olten players
Hartford Whalers players
Ice hockey people from Ontario
Living people
Los Angeles Kings players
National Hockey League All-Stars
New Haven Nighthawks players
New York Islanders players
New York Rangers draft picks
New York Rangers players
People from Algoma District
Stanley Cup champions
Toronto Marlboros players
Toronto Toros draft picks
Washington Capitals players
Canadian expatriate ice hockey players in Switzerland